Harold Hellenbrand (born 1953) is a retired American college professor, scholar, administrator, and author. He has held several faculty and administrative roles at various institutions, such as the Chair of the English department at California State University, San Bernardino, Dean at the University of Minnesota Duluth, Dean at California Polytechnic State University, San Luis Obispo, and most notably, Provost and Vice President of Academic Affairs at California State University, Northridge, where until his retirement he taught in the English department. He is known especially for his biography of Thomas Jefferson, The Unfinished Revolution: Education and Politics in the Thought of Thomas Jefferson.

Personal life 
Hellenbrand was the only child of Julius A. Hellenbrand, an attorney and justice of the New York State Supreme Court, and Gail Hellenbrand, a politician.  According to a 2012 interview with Cal State Northridge's student newspaper, The Sundial, Hellenbrand wanted be an architect when he was a kid, because he always liked design and mathematics. He played soccer, baseball, and football, with soccer being his favorite sport. His favorite novel is Invisible Man by Ralph Ellison. Raymond Chandler is his favorite author, and his favorite film is Dog Day Afternoon, starring Al Pacino

Education 
Harold Hellenbrand attended Poly Prep in Brooklyn, graduating in 1971.  He earned his bachelor's degree in English and American literature from Harvard College in 1975. He later received his doctorate in modern thought and literature from Stanford University in 1980.

Career

History of Teaching 
Hellenbrand started his career as a faculty member in the English Department, and later as Chair, at California State University, San Bernardino from 1982 to 1994. He later moved to Minnesota where he served as Dean and Professor at the College of Liberal Arts at the University of Minnesota, Duluth from 1994 to 1998.  He served as Dean and Professor at the College of Liberal Arts at Cal Poly, San Luis Obispo from 1998 to 2004. He currently serves as Professor in the English Department at California State University, Northridge, where he had earlier served as Provost and Vice President for Academic Affairs for eleven years, during which time he implemented several major changes on campus.

Role at California State University, Northridge 
Hellenbrand became Provost and Vice President for Academic Affairs at California State University, Northridge in 2004.  He served in this capacity until January 2012, when he was appointed Interim President at CSUN by the Chancellor of the California State University (CSU) system. Hellenbrand served in the interim role until Dianne F. Harrison was appointed as the president of CSUN in June 2012, when he returned to the provost and vice president position. By the end of his tenure as provost, CSUN had an average enrollment of 40,000 students and employment of 4,000 faculty and staff members. Hellenbrand's strengths were in planning, K-12 linkages, retention efforts, and commitment to diversity. He stepped down from the provost position in 2015 and taught in the CSUN English department for several years until he retired with Emeritus status.

Media 
 “Kristyan Kouri and Harold Hellenbrand: College is a wise investment for all”: Kouri and Hellenbrand published an article titled “College is a wise investment for all” in the Los Angeles Daily News on June 22, 2011 followed by an update from August 28, 2017. The article talks about the importance of obtaining a college education and how there should be better funding in order for California residents to have more access to college education along with programs that specifically help students with certain needs such as the Educational Opportunity Program (EOP). Kouri and Hellenbrand gave two testimonies of two students who lived lives that were involved in gangs. Isabelle, one of the students, explained how EOP and Cal State, Northridge helped her to leave the gang life and realize her dreams. Kouri and Hellenbrand continue to emphasize how crucial it is for the public to understand that cuts to the California education system is threatening, and although it will cost money from the state in order to stop this mistake from happening, the state as a whole will benefit in the long run. In the long term, people with a college education earn more money which results in more tax revenues which also results in more money for the state for the state to use on population needs. Kouri and Hellenbrand conclude their article by reiterating how educational institutions like Cal State, Northridge are vital to the well being of all California residents and urged voters to demand more investment in education from the state.
 “Kristyan Kouri and Harold Hellenbrand: Economic barriers to college hit Hispanics especially hard”: Kouri and Hellenbrand published an article in the Los Angeles Daily News titled “Economic barriers to college hit Hispanics especially hard” on August 19, 2011 followed by an update August 28, 2017. The article lays out the significance that is a college education and what it means for disadvantaged communities such as the Latin community. The article tells the story of 90-year-old Nellie Saenz Chavez and her struggle of holding a life of low-paying jobs while also being a mother and having a husband who worked all day as well. Although Chavez was able to obtain a more decent life in her later years, her story is a prime example of the lack of educational opportunities that existed for Hispanics before modern times. From the last 10 to 15 years, there has been a significant increase in Hispanics with a college degree which serves evidence that funding for more educational opportunities have proven to be effective. Strangely, a study done by researchers at California State University, Sacramento, has shown that rates of college graduation of Hispanics have begun to drop. Kouri and Hellenbrand conclude by prompting readers to urge the state government to keep funding for higher education in California.

Awards

Don Dorsey Excellence in Mentoring Award 
Hellenbrand was the 2017 recipient of the Don Dorsey Excellence in Mentoring Award. The award was founded by the staff in the CSUN Faculty Mentor Program and EOP. It was named after educational psychology professor, Don Dorsey, who helped develop CSUN's first mentor training program. The award recognizes faculty and staff who made exceptional contributions to mentoring past and present students from diverse backgrounds and communities.

Eileen Tosney Award from the American Association of University Administrators 
Hellenbrand received the Eileen Tosney Award in 2014.  He was honored for his outstanding work as an administrator in the field of higher education, most often awarded as a capstone recognition.
“Harry’s career is the epitome why the AAUA created the Eileen Tosney Award,” CSUN President Dianne F. Harrison said. “Harry has committed his life to elevating students’ minds and is a true champion of access to education. He is an outstanding administrator who uses his keen intellect, his compassion, his dry wit and lots of data to constantly further the mission of the university”

William M. Plater Award from American Association of State Colleges and Universities  
The William M. Plator Award honored Hellenbrand's leadership in civic engagement. It is one of higher education's highest honors, and was given to Hellenbrand for his efforts in fighting for student retention and encouraging diversity in academia.

Works/Publications 
Harold Hellenbrand has authored the following books, essays, and articles:
 Hellenbrand, Harold. “Roads to Happiness: Rhetorical and Philosophical Design in Jefferson’s ‘Notes on the State of Virginia.’” Early American Literature, Vol. 20, No. 1. University of North Carolina Press, 1985. 
 Hellenbrand, Harold. “Not ‘to Destroy But to Fulfil’: Jefferson, Indians, and Republican Dispensation.” Eighteenth-Century Studies, Vol. 18, No. 4. Johns Hopkins University Press, 1985. 
  Hellenbrand, Harold. “Speech, after Silence: Alice Walker's The Third Life of Grange Copeland.” Black American Literature Forum, Vol. 20, No. 1/2. African American Review (St. Louis University), 1986. 
 Hellenbrand, Harold. The Unfinished Revolution: Education and Politics in the Thought of Thomas Jefferson. University of Delaware Press, 1990. 
 Hellenbrand, Harold. “The Roots of Democracy.” The William and Mary Quarterly, Vol. 48, No. 1. Omohundro Institute of Early American History and Culture, 1991. 
 Hellenbrand, Harold. “Account, Accounting, Accountability.” Profession, Modern Language Association, 2002.

References 

1953 births
Living people
American academic administrators
American writers
California Polytechnic State University faculty
California State University, Northridge faculty
California State University, San Bernardino faculty
Harvard University alumni
People from Brooklyn
Poly Prep alumni
Stanford University alumni
University of Minnesota Duluth faculty